The Charlotte Symphony Orchestra is an American orchestra based in Charlotte, North Carolina.  As the largest and most active professional performing arts organization in the central Carolinas , the Charlotte Symphony plays approximately 100 performances each season and employs 100 professional musicians, 62 of whom are on full-time contracts.  Annual attendance for CSO performances numbers over 200,000.

Founded in 1932 by Spanish conductor and composer Guillermo S. de Roxlo leading 15 musicians,
the Orchestra was led by conductor Christof Perick from 2001 to 2010.   In May 2009, the Charlotte Symphony Orchestra named Christopher Warren-Green its 11th music director, effective with the 2010–2011 season. Perick continued his association with the orchestra as conductor laureate in the 2010–2011 season.

The Orchestra’s principal home is the 1,970-seat Belk Theater of the Blumenthal Performing Arts Center.  The official chorus of the Orchestra is the Charlotte Master Chorale. The Symphony also serves as the resident orchestra for Opera Carolina and Charlotte Ballet. The Symphony Park amphitheater at SouthPark is home to Charlotte Symphony Orchestra’s Summer Pops concerts.

In 2007, the Charlotte Symphony Orchestra released its first compact disc, a collection of orchestral masterworks by Beethoven, Schubert, Mahler, and Mozart, conducted by Christof Perick.

In July 2009, the Charlotte Symphony Orchestra launched a bridge fund campaign at its “Celebrate America” concert in Charlotte’s Symphony Park, with a goal of raising $5.6 million to cover projected budget gaps over a six-year period.  This fund is separate from the Symphony’s annual operating budget of $7.6 million.  As of February 2010, the Symphony had raised $4.3 million toward the bridge fund goal.

References

External links
Charlotte Symphony Orchestra official website

Musical groups established in 1932
American orchestras
Musical groups from North Carolina
Culture of Charlotte, North Carolina
Tourist attractions in Charlotte, North Carolina
Organizations based in Charlotte, North Carolina
Performing arts in North Carolina